Bagets: Just Got Lucky is an afternoon youth-oriented television show in the Philippines that is produced by Viva Television and developed by TV5. It is a remake of the 1984 films Bagets and Bagets 2. The show aired from May 15, 2011 to February 12, 2012, replacing Luv Crazy and was replaced by Kapitan Awesome.

Synopsis
Bagets centers on a story of young individuals coming from different backgrounds and co-existing in a campus despite their class differences and clashing personalities. These interesting characters include school rivals Ace (AJ Muhlach) and Georgina (Nadine Lustre), who bring out the best and the worst of each other through their competition. Ace is a friendly athletic scholar who is popular in school due to his academic and extra-curricular activities while Georgina is a working student and a campus leader who is not afraid to speak her mind. Meanwhile, competing with Ace for George's attention is a rich kid named Jules (Josh Padilla), who is popular with the girls because of his good looks, charm, and affluence. Jules’ confidence, however, sometimes borders on arrogance.

There is also the "kikay" girl Gayle (Shy Carlos) who stalks "emo" guy JC (Rico dela Paz). The two will eventually discover and appreciate their individualities more than their differences. On the other hand, Santi (Johan Lourens), who comes from an affluent family, is linked to social climber and poser Tara (Eula Caballero). When Santi falls in love with Tara, she gets caught between her lies and revealing her true feelings to Santi. Last but not least, the boy-loves-girl and the girl-hates-boy type of relationship between Hiro (Aki Torio) and Liezl (Meg Imperial) will definitely stir up the story of the exciting Bagets series.

Cast

Main cast
The Boys
AJ Muhlach as Ace Delgado
Johan Laurens as Santi Pecson
Rico dela Paz as JC Enriquez
Aki Torio as Hiro Galura
Josh Padilla as Jules Soriano

The Girls
Nadine Lustre as Georgina George Evangelista
Shy Carlos as Gayle Fresnido 
Eula Caballero as Tara Montes
Imee Hart as Hannah Fresnido
Meg Imperial as Liezl Rubio
 
Campus Bullies
Martin Velayo as Matthew Matty Pineda (Mama's Boy)
Julian Calderon as Julian Roxas 
Lucas Zamora as Mac

The Mean Girls
Mariel Bitanga as Mandy
Joan Singh as Simone Luis "The IT Girl"
Coraleen Waddell as Sachi

Supporting cast
Raymond Lauchengco as Ariel
Cheska Iñigo as Santi's mother
Aifha Medina as Miss KC 
Almira Muhlach as Leizl's mother
Bernadette Allyson as Ace's mother
Biboy Ramirez as JC's father
Candy Pangilinan as Hiro's mother
Dingdong Avanzado as George's father
Ella Guevara as Hiro's sister
Jao Mapa as Jules and Ace father
Jef Gaitan as Miss Jelai
Joy Viado as Principal Subong
LJ Moreno as JC's mother
Nikita McElroy as Hiro's sister
Erika Padilla as Tara's sister
Dino Imperial as Dustin Herrera
CJ Jaravata as Gayle and Hannah's mother

See also
List of programs aired by TV5 (Philippine TV network)

References

TV5 (Philippine TV network) original programming
Philippine teen drama television series
2011 Philippine television series debuts
2012 Philippine television series endings
Television series by Viva Television
Filipino-language television shows
Television series about teenagers